Endotricha dentiprocessa is a species of snout moth in the genus Endotricha. It is found in China (Guangxi).

The wingspan is 17−18.5 mm. The forewings are blackish brown, covered with dense reddish brown scales. The hindwings are concolorous to the forewings, but yellowish white on the costal margin.

Etymology
The specific epithet is from the Latin prefix dent- (meaning dentate) and processus (meaning process) and refers to the valva with narrow sclerotized plate bearing large teeth ventrobasally.

References

Moths described in 2012
Endotrichini